Trenhotel is a long distance, high-quality overnight train service which uses Talgo tilting trains technology and sleeping cars developed by the Spanish rail network operator Renfe. It is operated by Renfe when it operates within Spain, and is operated by its subsidiary Elipsos when in France, Switzerland and Italy.

The specially developed Talgo carriages are sometimes used by other railway companies, although usually in other livery. Trenhotel also offers special facilities for disabled passengers. Previously a competing night train service called Tren Estrella operated within Spain; this used traditional carriages on conventional Spanish (broad gauge) tracks.

Composition and services
Each Talgo train is composed of several interchangeable carriage types, permitting flexible composition depending on the mission. Tilting train technology is used with the series IV, V, VI and VII carriages.

The series IV do not have gauge change required for cross-border routes and high speed lines, consequently being restricted to operate within the Iberian Peninsula standard network. 
The series VI are approved for circulation in France, Switzerland, Italy, Germany and Portugal.

A typical Trenhotel composition has:
 Tourist Seats (asientos turistas): similar to the first class (aircraft style) seats on regular trains. On Series VII and international carriages these can be reclined until they are completely horizontal.
 Tourist Cabins: These have washing facilities and four beds which are sold either as a family unit (the cabin is reserved as a whole) or alternatively individual beds may be sold separately so that male and female passengers who may be strangers are not mixed
 Preferred Cabins: Equipped with a sink flush toilet closet, they also have two beds, which are sold as single a unit for one or two occupants.
 High-class cabins: feature a shower, toilet and two beds, which are also sold as single a unit for one or two occupants.
 Cafeteria service units usually with seating and often some limited cabin service.
 Dining car providing full European style meals of different types, depending on the time of the day, and some limited service outside of usual working-hours.

Traction
Trenhotel units are trailers so all need to incorporate a tractor locomotive. Within Spain, Trenhotel usually uses a Renfe series 252 in electrified areas and Renfe series 334 diesel locomotive in non-electrified areas, while in Portugal it uses CP Series 5600 electric locomotive in electrified areas and CP Series 1400 diesel locomotive in non-electrified areas (only needed if the train is diverted via Badajoz). On international routes the locomotive unit is changed at the border (Vilar Formoso).

Routes
Trenhotel routes are named after famous Spanish places or people. As of recently, Trenhotel routes are limited, so passengers should make sure to check with a train station (or online train app) as to which ones are running.

Suspension of service during the Covid-19 pandemic
As a result of the COVID-19 pandemic, Trenhotel connections were discontinued beginning March 17, 2020. At the end of April 2020, Renfe announced the suspension of all night Trenhotel services due to lack of profitability. As a result, Lisbon loses its only international train connection to the rest of Europe. After talks with regional governments, Renfe announced on May 2, 2020 that Trenhotel services to the Spanish region of Galicia would not be discontinued. However by the end of April 2021, none of the suspended services had been reintroduced.

References

External links
 Renfe Trenhotel

Passenger rail transport in Spain